Paul Sandby  (1731 – 7 November 1809) was an English map-maker turned landscape painter in watercolours, who, along with his older brother Thomas, became one of the founding members of the Royal Academy in 1768.

Life and work

Sandby was born in Nottingham, and baptised there in 1731, although his date of birth has traditionally been given as 1725. In 1745 he moved to London where he followed his brother Thomas in obtaining an appointment in the military drawing department at the Tower of London. Following the suppression of the Jacobite rebellion of 1745, Sandby was employed to assist in the military survey of the new road to Fort George, and of the northern and western parts of the Highlands, under the direction of Colonel David Watson. He was later appointed draughtsman to the survey.

While undertaking this commission, which included preparing designs for new bridges and fortifications, he began producing watercolour landscapes documenting the changes in Scotland since the rebellion, and making sketches of Scottish events such as the hanging in Edinburgh of soldier-turned-forger John Young in 1751. When in Edinburgh, he started sketching and drawing the landscapes of the city and was said to have to carried a copy of Theatrum Scotia in his pockets. One such sketching in the form of engraving, West View of the City of Edinburgh, is now displayed in the Scottish National Gallery of Modern Art.

He left his post with the survey in 1751, and spent some time living with his brother, who had been appointed  Deputy Ranger of Windsor Great Park. There he assisted his brother, and made a series of drawings of the castle, the town, and its neighbourhood, which were purchased by Sir Joseph Banks. His skills were applauded by fellow artists such as Thomas Gainsborough: if one wanted "real Views from Nature in this Country", declared Gainsborough in 1764, there was no better artist than Sandby, who frequently "employ'd his pencil that way."

He also etched a large number of plates after his own drawings, a hundred of which (including views of Edinburgh) were  published in a volume in 1765. In 1760 he issued twelve etchings of The Cries of London. He also made many plates after other artists, including his brother. In 1753–4 he published, anonymously, several single caricatures satirising William Hogarth.<ref>Geoff Quilley, "The Analysis of Deceit: Sandby's Satires against Hogarth", in John Bonehill and Stephen Daniels (eds.), Paul Sandby: Picturing Britain, exh. cat., London: Royal Academy of Arts, 2009, 38-47.</ref> He returned to the attack in 1762, and produced other satirical work sporadically throughout his career.

It is not recorded how long Sandby lived with his brother at Windsor, but he is said to have spent part  of each year in London, and much of his time was probably spent on sketching excursions. On 3 May 1757 he married Anne Stogden, and by 1760 he was settled in London.

In 1760 he contributed to the first exhibition of the Society of Artists. He exhibited regularly with the society until the foundation of the Royal Academy eight years later, and was one of its first directors when it was incorporated in 1765. In 1768, he was appointed chief drawing master to the Royal Military Academy at Woolwich, a position he retained until 1799. On the formation of the Royal Academy in the same year he was one of the 28 founder-members nominated by George III. He often served on its council, and contributed to  all but eight of the exhibitions held between 1769 and 1809.

Sandby made extensive journeys around Britain and Ireland, sketching scenery and ancient monuments. He made his first recorded visit to Wales in 1770, later (1773) touring south Wales with Sir Joseph Banks, resulting in the 1775 publication of XII Views in South Wales and a further 12 views the following year, part of a 48-plate series of aquatint engravings depicting Welsh scenery commissioned by Banks.

He died at his house in Paddington on 7 November 1809, and was buried in the burial ground of St George's, Hanover Square. He was described in his obituaries as "the father of modern landscape painting in watercolors".

Gallery

See also
English school of painting

References

Further reading

 Julian Faigan, Paul Sandby RA. The Collection in the City of Hamilton Art Gallery (University of Melbourne MA Thesis, 1984).
L. Herrmann. Paul and Thomas Sandby (Batsford, 1986).
 Andrew Wilton & Anne Lyles. The Great Age of British Watercolours (1750–1880) (Prestel, 1993). 
 Anne Lyles & Robin Hamlyn. British watercolours from the Oppé Collection (Tate Gallery Publishing, 1997). 
 Michael Charlesworth, "Thomas Sandby climbs the Hoober Stand", Art History, 19, 2, (1996).
 Michael Charlesworth, Landscape and Vision (Ashgate, 2008), Chapter One.
 Ann V. Gunn, '"The Fire of Faction": Sources for Paul Sandby's Satires of 1762-63', Print Quarterly, Vol.XXXIV no.4, (2017), pp. 400–18.

External links

 
Paul Sandby online (artcyclopedia.com).
Picturing Britain: Paul Sandby (1731-1809) (Daily Telegraph - 27 July 2009).
Paul Sandby, Unlikely Founder of Dazzling School of European Art, Souren Melikian, New York Times, 16 April 2010
  A detailed Paul Sandby biography Edited by Charles Holme. Text by Alexander J Finberg & E A Taylor. The Development of British Landscape Painting in Water-colours.
 Connected Histories: British History Sources, 1500-1900 This JISC-funded web service provides federated searching of online historical resources for research. The web link provides access to primary sources which refer to Paul Sandby.
 Profile on Royal Academy of Arts Collections
 Sandby Collection at the Hamilton Gallery (Hamilton, Victoria, Australia) (includes a brief biography of Sandby and the history of the Hamilton Gallery's Sandby Collection)

1731 births
1809 deaths
18th-century English painters
19th-century English painters
18th-century English male artists
19th-century English male artists
Landscape artists
English male painters
English watercolourists
Artists from Nottingham
People from Woolwich
People from Old Windsor
Royal Academicians
Street cries